Jacqueline Cako (born August 30, 1991) is an inactive American tennis player of Hungarian descent.

She has won two singles and 12 doubles titles on the ITF Women's Circuit. In October 2017, she reached her best singles ranking of world No. 172. In April 2018, she peaked at No. 87 in the doubles rankings.

Grand Slam doubles performance timeline

WTA 125 finals

Doubles: 1 (runner-up)

ITF finals

Singles: 6 (2–4)

Doubles: 28 (12–16)

References

External links

 
 
 Jacqueline Cako at the Arizona State Sun Devils

1991 births
Living people
People from Snohomish County, Washington
American female tennis players
Arizona State Sun Devils women's tennis players
Tennis people from Washington (state)